The 2019–20 season is Vélez Sarsfield's 78th consecutive season in the top division of Argentine football. In addition to the Primera División, the club are competing in the Copa Argentina, Copa de la Superliga and Copa Sudamericana.

The season generally covers the period from 1 July 2019 to 30 June 2020.

Review

Pre-season
Luciano Tilger was the first transfer-related occurrence of Vélez Sarsfield's season, as he agreed a permanent move to Almirante Brown on 14 June 2019. On 18 June, the club announced three signings in Tomás Guidara, from Belgrano, and Maximiliano Romero, on loan from PSV. Soon after, Fernando Gago put pen to paper on a one-year contract, months after his release from Boca Juniors. Joaquín Laso went to Atlético San Luis of Liga MX on 19 June. Gastón Díaz was released on 24 June, after he and the club mutually parted ways - he later joined Colón. Álvaro López's loan deal with Almirante Brown was renewed on 25 June. Numerous loans from the past campaign officially expired on and around 30 June. Guido Mainero was loaned to Defensa y Justicia on 1 July.

Vélez were held to draws by Villa Dálmine in friendlies on 6 July. Romero scored his first goal for them on 10 July in a pre-season match with Estudiantes of Buenos Aires at Villa Olímpica in Ituzaingó. Rodrigo Cáseres and Mauricio Toni headed to Justo José de Urquiza and Alvarado on 12 July. Vélez shared a friendly win apiece with Banfield on 13 July. Espanyol confirmed the incoming of Matías Vargas on 14 July. Atlético Tucumán were taken care of in pre-season on 16 July, beating them one-nil twice. Uruguayan Matías de los Santos was signed on loan from Millonarios on 18 July. Vélez defeated Huracán in an exhibition on 20 July, though then lost hours later. A transaction with Tigre featuring Lucas Janson and Jonathan Ramis was agreed on 25 July.

July
A defeat away to Talleres on 28 July got Vélez Sarsfield's league campaign underway, as Jony scored the game's only goal for the hosts. Lucas Janson officially arrived from Tigre on 30 July, as Jonathan Ramis went the other way on loan. Also on that day, Rodrigo Salinas, fresh from signing a new contract with Vélez, was loaned to Newell's Old Boys.

August
Nicolás Delgadillo, off a loan with San Martín, was loaned again on 1 August as he joined Patronato. Vélez threw away a two-goal lead in the Primera División versus reigning champions Racing Club, as they drew 2–2 despite early goals from Nicolás Domínguez and Maximiliano Romero. Vélez played Talleres in friendlies on 10 August, winning 1–0 and 2–0. Gianluca Mancuso left on a two-year loan deal to Valladolid on 12 August. Vélez lost on the road in the league for the second time running on 18 August, as Lanús beat them in Buenos Aires. Following no victory in three, Vélez secured their opening win of 2019–20 on 24 August after beating Newell's Old Boys 3–1. Vélez revealed, on 29 August, that a deal had been agreed with Bologna for Nicolás Domínguez.

Vélez won for the second week running on 30 August, after defeating Estudiantes by one-goal away from home in the Primera División. Bologna confirmed the signing of Nicolás Domínguez on 30 August, with the central midfielder immediately returning to Vélez on a temporary basis.

September
Emiliano Amor departed on loan to Primera B Nacional's San Martín on 3 September, as he extended his Vélez contract in the process.

Squad

Transfers
Domestic transfer windows:3 July 2019 to 24 September 201920 January 2020 to 19 February 2020.

Transfers in

Transfers out

Loans in

Loans out

Friendlies

Pre-season
Vélez Sarsfield would face Banfield in a pre-season friendly, as revealed on 19 June by their opponents. Atlético Tucumán scheduled a match with them on 24 June. Two days later, Buenos Aires' Estudiantes announced a game with Vélez. Friendlies with Villa Dálmine and Huracán were set for 6/20 July on 2/17 July.

Mid-season
They'd meet Talleres in friendly matches on 10 August, before facing Arsenal de Sarandí in early September.

Competitions

Primera División

League table

Relegation table

Source: AFA

Results summary

Matches
The fixtures for the 2019–20 campaign were released on 10 July.

Copa Argentina

Copa de la Superliga

Copa Sudamericana

Squad statistics

Appearances and goals

Statistics accurate as of 31 August 2019.

Goalscorers

Notes

References

Club Atlético Vélez Sarsfield seasons
Vélez Sarsfield